Guillermo Meneses (Caracas, 15 December 1911 - Porlamar, Nueva Esparta, 29 December 1978) was a Venezuelan writer, playwright, and journalist. He was the author of La Balandra 'Isabel' llegó esta tarde  and Campeones, among other works.  His awards and honors include the Venezuelan National Prize for Literature (1967), the "Order of the city of Caracas", and the "Andrés Bello Order" created by President Rafael Caldera.

Bibliography 
La Balandra Isabel llegó esta tarde (Caracas, 1934)
Canción de Negros (Caracas, 1934)
La Nación (Caracas, 1934)
Tres cuentos Venezolanos (Caracas, 1938)
El Mestizo José Vargas (Caracas, 1942)
La Mujer, el As de Oro y La Luna (Caracas, 1948)
La Mano Junto al Muro (París, 1952)
Antología del Cuento Venezolano (Caracas, 1955)
Venezuela (Paris, 1956)
Hoy en Casa Leyendo (Caracas, 1960)
Cuento de Venezuela (Caracas, 1960)
Cable Cifrado (Caracas, 1961)
Discurso de Orden (Caracas, 1965)
El Duque (Caracas, 1965, 1970)
Espejos y Disfraces (Caracas,1967)
Libro de Caracas (Caracas, 1967)
Los Muros de Venezuela (Caracas, 1967)
Diez Cuentos (Caracas, 1968)
Cinco Novelas (Caracas, 1972)

See also 
Venezuela
Venezuelan literature
List of Venezuelan writers

References 
  Guillermo Meneses biography

1911 births
1978 deaths
20th-century Venezuelan historians
20th-century Venezuelan novelists
Venezuelan male writers
Male novelists
People from Caracas
Central University of Venezuela alumni
20th-century male writers
Generation of 1928